Secondary Education Examination is a level of education examination that may mean different things in different countries:

Certificate of Secondary Education Examination (Tanzania)
Certificate of Secondary Education (former UK qualification)
Hong Kong Certificate of Education Examination
Hong Kong Diploma of Secondary Education
Karnataka Secondary Education Examination Board
Secondary Education Examination (Nepal)
Higher Secondary Examination (India, Nepal, Bangladesh & Pakistan]]

See also
 List of secondary school leaving qualifications